Nanchang Metro, officially Nanchang Rail Transit, is a rapid transit system in Nanchang, Jiangxi, China. As of 2021, four lines are operational. The Metro opened for commercial operation in December 2015. The network is currently  in length in December 2021 with 4 lines.

Network

Network map

Planned

Original plan

Extensions of Lines 1 & 2
On 24 November 2020, the National Development and Reform Commission approved the extensions of Lines 1 & 2.

History

Origins
The construction of a rail transit system in Nanchang was first proposed in the beginning of the 2000s. The population of the urban core of Nanchang is projected to reach 3.5 million people by 2020. In August 2005, Jiangxi Provincial Development & Reform Commission and Nanchang City Government replied to the proposal of building a metro system, and the City Government considered listing the proposal in the Eleventh Five-year plan. In November, a plan of 4 metro and 1 light rail was drafted. In 2006, the City officially started the research of building a rail transit system. In the second half of 2007, the prophase research of the construction of the system was initiated. On 30 July 2008, the construction of Nanchang Metro was formally included in the priority agenda.

Plans

Initial Plan

In 2008, Nanchang was approved to build a rail transit system by the State Council, and Nanchang Rail Transit Group Co., Ltd. was incorporated on 16 October 2008 to construct and operate Nanchang Metro. On 15 September, the planned 5 routes were notified to the public, which was approved by the State Council in July 2009. On 29 July 2009, the construction of Nanchang City Rapid Rail Transit officially began, and also on the same day the detailed route and construction plan of the five lines was proclaimed at the press conference.

In April 2013, the Government planned to acquire approval for all 5 lines by 2014, start constructing all planned lines from 2015, and plan  Line 6 to Line 10 to complement the existing network.

Phase 2
On 31 May 2013, Nanchang Government submitted three candidate plans for the Phase 2 construction (2014-2020) to the expert panel, which chose the compromising Plan 2. According to the plan, Line 2 will be extended to both directions from 2014, Line 1 from 2016; the construction of Line 3 will start as soon as September 2014, and Line 4 will be constructed as soon as September 2015.

Construction
Construction of Line 1 has started on 29 July 2009, and the line opened on December 26, 2015. As of August 2013, the construction of Line 2 also started with the first section opening on August 18, 2017.

Rolling Stock 

Ticketing
Single ticket will be available as plastic packaged RFID coin like many other cities in China. Existing pre-payment smart cards such as local Hongcheng Tong are also expected to be used in Nanchang Metro.

Notes

References

External links

 Official Website 
 Nanchang at UrbanRail.net

 
Rail transport in Jiangxi
Rapid transit in China